Hrangkhol or Hrangkhawl may refer to:

Hrangkhol people
Hrangkhol language

Language and nationality disambiguation pages